Teerthanker Mahaveer University also known as TMU is a private university in Moradabad (Brass City), Uttar Pradesh, India. The University stands committed to the ideals of Lord Mahaveer and aspires to be recognised as the ultimate destination for world-class education. Established in 2008 by the Government of Uttar Pradesh Act No.30 and approved by the University Grants Commission (UGC) under Section 2 (f) and 12 (B) of the UGC Act, 1956. NAAC A, ICAR, and various other regulatory authorities have accredited the University. The University offers career-oriented programmes at all levels, i.e., UG, PG, and doctoral degrees across diverse streams.

History
The university owes its origin to Teerthanker Mahaveer Institute of Management and Technology (TMIMT), which forayed into professional education in the year 2001 by Shri Suresh Jain. With a vision to impart quality professional education to the students of an otherwise educationally backward city in all the major domains, the university came into existence in 2008. Currently, it offers over 150 programmes through its 14 on-campus colleges and 2 independent teaching departments. The university has also made collaborative arrangements with national and international institutions.

Teerthanker Mahaveer University, since the start, heavily relied on teaching the industrial relevant practices, and hence it has garnered a positive reflection on the placements and internships quotient. The university also provides the student’s in-house training to enhance their technical skills by building projects using recent technologies such as Python, Machine Learning, Android and Advance Java, etc.

Campus 
The University campus is spread across 140 acres of vast expanse, exhibits ornate, state-of-the-art infrastructure with luxurious amenities inside the premises for the staff and the students. The campus has all the essentials plus exclusive amenities like hostels for boys and girls with AC & Non AC facilities, spacious rooms, a mess with sumptuous clean food, restaurants, and eateries to have tastes of different trending cuisines for the staff and students to savour; bank branch with postings of ATM units across the campus; 24x7 CCTV surveillance and security for hostels and gates; indoor stadium, gym, outdoor sit-outs, stationery stores; auditorium, TMU multi-super speciality hospital with 1008 bed capacity. The University is also home to an international standard cricket stadium with a dedicated clock tower pavilion. The classrooms are furnished with smart facilities and technical laboratories with the latest equipment. The other TMU facilities include libraries with over 2 lakh books, student clubs, lecture theatres, and multiple subscriptions to online databases.

Organisation and Administration 

●     Medical College & Research Centre

Departments

●     Anatomy

●     Physiology

●     Biochemistry

●     Pathology

●     Microbiology

●     Pharmacology

●     Forensic Medicine

●     Community Medicine

●     General Medicine

●     Pulmonary Medicine

●     Psychiatry

●     Dermatology

●     Paediatrics

●     Anesthesiology

●     Radiology

●     General Surgery

●     Orthopaedics

●     Ent

●     Ophthalmology

●     Obstetrics & Gynaecology

●     Dental College & Research Centre

Departments

●     Conservative Dentistry & Endodontics

●     Oral & Maxillofacial Surgery

●     Orthodontics & Dentofacial Orthopedics

●     Prosthodontics and Crown & Bridge

●     Paedodontics & Preventive Dentistry

●     Periodontology

●     Public Health Dentistry

●     Oral Medicine & Radiology

●     Oral Pathology & Microbiology

●     College of Nursing

Departments

●     Obstetrics & Gynaecological Nursing

●     Medical Surgical Nursing

●     Community Health Nursing

●     Paediatric Nursing

●     Psychiatric Nursing

●     Fundamental of Nursing

●     College of Pharmacy

Departments

●     Pharmacy

●     Pharmacology

●     Pharmaceutics

●     College of Paramedical Sciences

●     Department of Physiotherapy

●     TMIMT College of Management

●     College of Law & Legal Studies

●     College of Computing Sciences and IT

●     Faculty of Engineering

Departments

●     Civil Engineering

●     Electrical & Electronics Engineering

●     Electronics & Communication Engineering

●     Mechanical Engineering

●     Computer Science & Engineering

●     Applied Science & Humanities

●     College of Fine Arts

●     Faculty of Education

●     TMIMT College of Physical Education

●     College of Agriculture Sciences

●     Centre for Jain Studies

Approvals
The University has the necessary approvals of all the regulatory bodies governing different programs detailed as under:

Rankings 
●     TMU’s Institution Innovation Council (IIC) secured 4 Star Rating

●     TMU’s CCSIT received the title of 'Band Performer' in Atal Ranking 2021.

●     TMU received 12B status.

●     Teerthanker Mahaveer Institute of Management & Technologies has secured the 3rd position (A grade category) in the Chronicle B-school survey.

Teaching-Learning Approach

 Assignments
 Business Simulations
 Case Studies
 Classroom Learning
 Excursion Tours
 Field Researches
 Guest Lectures
 Industry Visits
 Meditation & Yoga
 Panel Discussions
 Presentations
 Quizzes
 Research Projects
 Role Plays and Management Games
 Scenario Writing
 Team Work
 Theatre Techniques

Notable alumni
Pinki Singh Yadav, MLA

References

External links

Jain universities and colleges
Educational institutions established in 2008
Private universities in Uttar Pradesh
2008 establishments in Uttar Pradesh
Education in Moradabad
Agricultural universities and colleges in Uttar Pradesh